Mesrlu (also Romanized as Meşrlū and Meşerlū; also known as Masleh and Messeleh) is a village in Hendudur Rural District, Sarband District, Shazand County, Markazi Province, Iran. At the 2006 census, its population was 82, in sixteen families.

References 

Populated places in Shazand County